The Czechoslovakia national badminton team (Czechoslovak: Československá reprezentácia v bedmintone) represented Czechoslovakia in international badminton team competitions. The Czechoslovakian team competed in the 1991 Sudirman Cup before the nation was split into the Czech Republic and Slovakia. It was controlled by the Czechoslovak Badminton Association (Czechoslovak: Československý Bedmintonový Sväz).

The Czechoslovakian team also once competed in the Helvetia Cup. Czechoslovakia won the tournament once in 1973.

Participation in BWF competitions

Sudirman Cup

Participation in European Team Badminton Championships 

Mixed team

Participation in Helvetia Cup

Squad 
Before the dissolution of Czechoslovakia, the following players were selected to represent the country in international tournaments.

Male players
Tomasz Mendrek
Petr Janda
Daniel Gaspar
Richard Hobzik

Female players
Eva Lacinová
Jitka Lacinová
Markéta Koudelková

References

 

Badminton
National badminton teams
Badminton in Czechoslovakia